The NYSAC World Heavyweight Championship was a professional wrestling world heavyweight championship owned and promoted by the New York State Athletic Commission. The title existed from 1929 through 1934.

Title history

References

World heavyweight wrestling championships
Sports in New York (state)